This article lists important figures and events in the public affairs of British Malaya during the year 1941, together with births and deaths of prominent Malayans. The Japanese occupation of Malaya started in December 1941.

Incumbent political figures

Central level (until February 1942) 
 Governor of Federated of Malay States :
 Shenton Whitelegge Thomas
 Federal Secretaries of the Federated of Malay States :
 Hugh Fraser
 Governor of Straits Settlements :
 Shenton Whitelegge Thomas

State level (until February 1942) 
  Perlis :
 Raja of Perlis : Syed Alwi Syed Saffi Jamalullail
  Johore :
 Sultan of Johor : Sultan Ibrahim Al-Masyhur
  Kedah :
 Sultan of Kedah : Abdul Hamid Halim Shah
  Kelantan :
 Sultan of Kelantan : Sultan Ismail Sultan Muhammad IV
  Trengganu :
 Sultan of Trengganu : Sulaiman Badrul Alam Shah
  Selangor :
 British Residents of Selangor : G. M. Kidd
 Sultan of Selangor : Sultan Sir Hishamuddin Alam Shah Al-Haj 
  Penang :
 Monarchs : King George VI
 Residents-Councillors :  Arthur Mitchell Goodman
  Malacca :
 Monarchs : King George VI
 Residents-Councillors :
  Negri Sembilan :
 British Residents of Negri Sembilan : John Vincent Cowgill
 Yang di-Pertuan Besar of Negri Sembilan : Tuanku Abdul Rahman ibni Almarhum Tuanku Muhammad 
   Pahang :
 British Residents of Pahang : C. C. Brown
 Sultan of Pahang : Sultan Abu Bakar
  Perak :
 British Residents of Perak : Marcus Rex 
 Sultan of Perak : Sultan Abdul Aziz Al-Mutasim Billah Shah Ibni Almarhum Raja Muda Musa I

Events 
Below, the events of World War II have the "WW2" acronym
 8 December – WW2: Imperial Japanese Army landings at Pak Amat Beach, Kota Bharu. This marked the official start of the Japanese occupation of Malaya.
 8–11 December – WW2: Operation Krochol
 9 December – WW2: Sungai Petani, Butterworth and Alor Star airport were captured by the Imperial Japanese Army.
 10 December – WW2: The British battleship Prince of Wales and battlecruiser Repulse were sunk by Japanese aircraft after relying on false intelligence as to the location of the landings.
 11–13 December – WW2: Battle of Jitra
 14–16 December – WW2: Battle of Gurun
 18 December – WW2: Malayan Peoples's Anti Japanese Army (MPAJA) founded.
 30 December – WW2: Starting Battle of Kampar until 2 January 1942.
 Unknown date – Construction of India House (Penang) completed.

Births
 30 January – Ahmad Kamal Abdullah – Writer and National Sasterawan
 20 February – Lim Kit Siang – Democratic Action Party (DAP) politician
 1 March – Laila Taib – Wife to former Chief Minister of Sarawak, Abdul Taib Mahmud (died 2009)
 22 June – Ariffin Mohamad @ Ayah Pin – Secterian leader (died 2016)
 17 September – Syed Hussein Alatas – Writer
 26 September – Raja Jaafar – Raja Muda Perak
 7 October - Leo Moggie Anak Irok – Former Minister of Energy, Communication and Multimedia (1998-2004), Chairman Tenaga Nasional Berhad and Sabah Electricity Sdn Bhd
 1 November – Ahmad Fairuz Abdul Halim – Former Attorney General of Malaysia (2003-2007)
 Unknown date – A. Galak – Actor
 Unknown date – Mohd. Yusof Noor – Politician

See also
 1941 
 1940 in Malaya | 1942 in Malaya
 History of Malaysia

References

1940s in Malaya
Malaya